The Saint Lawrence River HVDC Powerline Crossing is the crossing of Hydro-Québec's Quebec-New England HVDC transmission line over (and later, under) the Saint Lawrence River  between Grondines and Lotbinière, Quebec, Canada. The crossing is remarkable, for being first implemented as an overhead crossing, and then later replaced by a cable tunnel. Hydro-Québec wanted to complete the transmission line in time, which was only possible with an overhead crossing of Saint Lawrence River. However, due to the negative visual impact of the large towers of the overhead crossing on the local populations of Grondines and Lotbinière, it was decided to build a cable tunnel under the river, although this made the project more expensive.

Overhead crossing construction
In 1988 construction work for three artificial islands in the Saint Lawrence River, which were connected with jetties to the mainland as construction for the pylons of the overhead crossing started. In 1989 the towers of the temporary overhead line crossing were erected. The suspension pylons on each side of the waterway were 140 meters (459 ft) tall to ensure the required clearance. Building these towers required five months construction time and approximately 40 specially trained workers. At the end of 1989 the overhead crossing, which consisted of five towers, was completed. After the tunnel was completed the overhead line and pylons used for it were dismantled. One of the pylons would later be used for the construction of the La Cité de l'Énergie observation tower.

Underground crossing construction
The average drilling rate was  a day, but achieved in horizontal sections over  a day. Later the tunnel was covered with concrete, and troughs for the cable support were installed. On November 1, 1990, the underground HVDC transmission line went in service with a transmission rate of 1200 MW, which was increased to 2250 MW on July 1, 1991.

In 1992 the overhead line over the Saint Lawrence River, including the artificial islands and the jetties were dismantled. Portions of one of these towers would later be used as part of the observation tower at La Cité de l'Énergie in Shawinigan.

See also 
 Hydro-Québec's electricity transmission system
 Quebec - New England Transmission

References 

Tunnels in Canada
Electric power transmission systems in Canada
Hydro-Québec
Powerline river crossings
Saint Lawrence River
HVDC transmission lines
Tunnels completed in 1991
Electric power infrastructure in Canada
Buildings and structures in Quebec
Energy in Quebec
1991 establishments in Quebec